The Security Police is the close protection division of the Tokyo Metropolitan Police Department. Under the Security Bureau of the TMPD, the division is responsible for protecting domestic and foreign dignitaries on Japanese soil and abroad.

The word "SP" is a loanword used in the Japanese law enforcement system, based on the badge worn by the agents.

The division does not protect the Imperial Family as they have their own dedicated division, the Imperial Protection Division.

History
After an assassination attempt against then-US Ambassador to Japan Edwin O. Reischauer in 1964, the chairman of the National Public Safety Commission was pressured to resign.

It was not until June 18, 1975 when then-Prime Minister Takeo Miki was attacked publicly by the Greater Japan Patriotic Party Secretary General Hiroyoshi Fudeyasu that the National Police Agency ordered the formation of the division. The new unit was based on the US Secret Service.

The unit celebrated its 40th anniversary in 2015.

After the assassination of Shinzo Abe, SP officers were deployed to protect Akie Abe after she arrived in Kyoto as a precautionary measure.

Scandals
On November 11, 2021, a SP officer was arrested for allegedly breaking into a womens-only condominium building.

Duties
The division is mandated to provide close protection duties for the following people:

 Prime Minister of Japan
 Ministers of State
 Chief Justice of Japan
 President of the House of Councillors
 Speaker of the House of Representatives
 Governor of Tokyo
 Foreign VIPs such as heads of states, ambassadors, etc.
 Other VIPs designated by the Commissioner General of the National Police Agency

Although it is not mandated, the division protects the Vice Speaker of the House of Representatives, the Vice President of the House of Councillors, and major party leaders.  

Retired prime ministers may be considered for SP protection. This is provided at the discretion of the National Police Agency.

Immediate family members of the Prime Minister do not have a permanent security detail, as they only receive protection during official duties or if they are with the Prime Minister.

Organization
The division is structured in the following way:

Director
Department Chief
General Clerk
Section 1
Mobile Security Squad
Section 2
Mobile Security Squad
Section 3
Mobile Security Squad
Section 4
Mobile Security Squad

Section 1 is mandated to protect the Prime Minister of Japan. Section 2 protects the Ministers of State, Speaker of the House of Councillors and the President of the House of Representatives. Section 3 is known to conduct duties on guarding foreign VIPs such as ambassadors and heads of state while Section 4 are to protect the Chief Justice of Japan, the Governor of Tokyo, and others qualified for protection such as the Vice President of the House of Councillors, the Vice Speaker of the House of Representatives, and party leaders.

In operations where SPs are deployed to other cities/towns in Japan and overseas, SP officers usually liaise with the local police in order to set up security for an incoming VIP or to scout potential locations where the VIP may visit.

Requirements

SP officers start out as an ordinary police officer, and must serve in the police for five years and have the rank of Sergeant in order to be a candidate. Moreover, candidates are required to be more than 5 feet 8 inches tall (173 cm) (for male candidates), achieve at least a third dan in at least one martial art, and have a high level of marksmanship. SP candidates also need to speak English.

Both male and female police officers can qualify for joining the division.

Equipment
Officers are mostly armed with handguns and expandable batons during their duties. A mini flashlight and a transceiver is also in their list of equipment. 
Sometimes they used unmarked cars for transport and escort. They have used Mercedes-Benz S600, Toyota Crown, Nissan Teana, Nissan Elgrand, and Toyota HiAce.

The officers carry mostly the NPA-issued Smith & Wesson Model 37 revolver, or the SIG P230 semi-automatic pistol. Officers can also be seen armed with pistols such as the Beretta 92, Glock 17 or Heckler & Koch P2000.

Notes

 Each of these sections are led by a Section Chief.

References

Bibliography

Protective security units
Police units of the Tokyo Metropolitan Police Department